Xerochlamys itremoensis is a shrub in the family Sarcolaenaceae. It is endemic to Madagascar.

Description
Xerochlamys itremoensis grows as a prostrate shrub. Its leaves are glossy green above, green to yellow on the underside. The tree's flowers are solitary with pink to white petals.

Distribution and habitat
Xerochlamys itremoensis is only found in the Itremo Massif in the central region of Amoron'i Mania.

Threats
Xerochlamys itremoensis, along with other plant species endemic to the Itremo Massif, is threatened by wildfires, harvesting and mining. The species often grows in rocky areas where quartzite and marble are present and mined. The conservation status of the species is endangered.

References

itremoensis
Endemic flora of Madagascar
Plants described in 2009